The 1999 Penn State Nittany Lions football team represented the Pennsylvania State University in the 1999 NCAA Division I-A football season. The team was coached by Joe Paterno and played its home games in Beaver Stadium in University Park, Pennsylvania.

Schedule
Penn State did not play Big Ten teams Northwestern and Wisconsin this year.

Roster

Rankings

Post season

NFL draft
Four Nittany Lions were drafted in the 2000 NFL Draft, including the first two overall picks.

Awards
 LaVar Arrington
Chuck Bednarik Award
Dick Butkus Award

Notes 

 Penn State sets a new single season attendance record of 675,503 fans.

References

Penn State
Penn State Nittany Lions football seasons
Alamo Bowl champion seasons
Penn State Nittany Lions football